This is a list of flag bearers who have represented Somalia at the Olympics.

Flag bearers carry the national flag of their country at the opening ceremony of the Olympic Games.

See also
Somalia at the Olympics

References

Somalia at the Olympics
Somalia
Olympic flagbearers
Olympic flagbearers